Renford Pinnock (26 September 1937 – 1 November 2019) was a Jamaican cricketer. He played 44 first-class matches for Jamaica between 1963 and 1975.

Playing career
Born in Spanish Town, Saint Catherine Parish, Pinnock made his debut in 1964, scoring 68 and 106, for Jamaica against Barbados at Kensington Oval. He eventually attained acclaim as a stylish right-handed batsman who also featured as a proficient wicket-keeper. Pinnock's highest score in first-class cricket was 175 against Barbados at Kensington. With an eventual average of just over 40, Pinnock hit six centuries and 2,662 runs in 44 first-class matches.

Subsequent career
At the end of his playing days, Pinnock worked as an umpire and coach for the Jamaica Cricket Association.

Personal life
Pinnock was the father of four sons and two daughters.

References

External links
 

1937 births
2019 deaths
Jamaican cricketers
Jamaica cricketers
People from Saint Catherine Parish